, the discography of The Darkness, a British hard rock band, consists of seven studio albums, one compilation album, one live album, one extended play (EP), one box set, thirty-two singles and twenty-four music videos.

The band released their debut EP I Believe in a Thing Called Love through label Must Destroy in August 2002. The Darkness released their first two singles, "Get Your Hands Off My Woman" and "Growing on Me" in 2003, which reached peaks of 52 
and 11 on the UK Singles Chart, respectively. These were followed in September by the band's debut album Permission to Land, which topped the UK Albums Chart and was certified four-times platinum by the British Phonographic Industry. Later singles from the album "I Believe in a Thing Called Love" and "Love Is Only a Feeling" peaked on the UK Singles Chart at numbers two and five respectively, while the Christmas single "Christmas Time (Don't Let the Bells End)" achieved the 2003 Christmas number two spot.

Their second album, One Way Ticket to Hell... and Back, was released in November 2005, preceded by the single "One Way Ticket"; the album was significantly less successful than its predecessor, reaching number eleven on the UK Albums Chart and receiving a silver certification from the BPI. Both "One Way Ticket" and follow-up single "Is It Just Me?" reached number eight on the singles chart, while the third and final single from the album, "Girlfriend", charted at number 39.

Following the band's first break up in 2006, The Platinum Collection compilation and a set comprising both of the band's albums were released in 2008.

The band reunited in 2011 then released "Nothing's Gonna Stop Us" in February 2012, followed by "Every Inch of You" in May, then "Everybody Have a Good Time" in June. The band's third album, Hot Cakes, was released in August 2012, reaching number four on the UK Albums Chart.

The band's fourth album, Last of Our Kind, was released on 2 June 2015, and their fifth album Pinewood Smile was released on 6 October 2017.

On 25 April 2018, it was announced that The Darkness would release their first live album Live at Hammersmith on 15 June 2018 with "Buccaneers of Hispaniola (Live)" and "I Believe in a Thing Called Love (Live)" available pre release on the day of announcement. "Solid Gold (Live)" was released 1 June.

The Darkness released their sixth album Easter Is Cancelled on 4 October 2019.  There were 3 singles released prior to the album "Rock and Roll Deserves to Die", "Heart Explodes" and the title track "Easter is Cancelled". Two further singles were released afterwards, "How Can I Lose Your Love" and "In Another Life" in December 2019 and January 2020 respectively.

Albums

Studio albums

Compilation albums

Live albums

Extended plays

Box sets

Singles

Music videos

References

Discographies of British artists
Rock music group discographies